Hans "Hasse" Selander (born 15 March 1945) is a Swedish former footballer who played as a defender.

Club career 
Selander played for Helsingborgs IF in Allsvenskan 1962–1968. Then he played for the minor club Upsala IF because of university studies. He then played for IK Sirius FK. In 1973–74 he played one season in the German Regionalliga with VfR Wormatia 08 Worms. After that Selander did great work with Halmstads BK and won Allsvenskan in 1976 and 1979. He retired in 1981.

International career 
Selander was capped 42 times for the Sweden national football team and scored 3 goals (1966–1977). He was also a member of the team in the 1970 FIFA World Cup where he participated in two games.

References

External links
Profile

1945 births
Living people
Swedish footballers
Sweden international footballers
1970 FIFA World Cup players
Helsingborgs IF players
Halmstads BK players
Expatriate footballers in Germany
Swedish football managers
Falkenbergs FF managers
IK Sirius Fotboll players
Association football defenders